Río Blanco (Spanish for "White River") may refer to:

Argentina 
 Río Blanco (Argentina)
 Río Blanco (Río de los Patos)

Belize
Rio Blanco (Belize)

Bolivia 
Río Blanco (Bolivia), a tributary of the Rio Guaporé

Chile

 Río Blanco (Aconcagua)
 Río Blanco (Ajatama)
 Río Blanco (Loa)
 Río Blanco (Chollay)

Guatemala
Río Blanco, San Marcos

Mexico
Río Blanco, Chiapas
Río Blanco, Oaxaca
Río Blanco, Veracruz, a town in Veracruz state
Río Blanco (Veracruz), a river in Veracruz state

Nicaragua
Río Blanco, Matagalpa

Peru
Rio Blanco mine, a copper mine in Loreto Region
Río Blanco or Yuraqmayu, a river in the Lima Region, Peru

Puerto Rico
Río Blanco (Ponce, Puerto Rico), a tributary of the Río Prieto

Spain
Río Blanco, Granada, a river in Sierra de Cogollos

United States
Rio Blanco (Colorado), a tributary of the San Juan River
Rio Blanco County, Colorado
Rio Blanco Oil Shale Company
Blanco River (Texas), a tributary of the San Marcos River

Uruguay
what would be the native (Spanish) name of the city of Río Branco, Uruguay, actually named in Portuguese in honor of a Brazilian diplomat

See also
 White River (disambiguation)
 Blanco River (disambiguation)
 Rivière Blanche (disambiguation)